Armenian Church is a multi-denominational concept. Thus it may refer to Armenian Apostolic, Armenian Catholic or Armenian Evangelical (Protestant) churches. It can also refer to individual  Christian Armenian religious buildings in various locations.

The Armenian Church
 Armenian Apostolic Church, founded in 1st century AD, adopted as state religion in 301
 Mother See of Holy Etchmiadzin
 Armenian Patriarchate of Jerusalem
 Armenian Patriarchate of Constantinople
 Holy See of Cilicia (official name: Armenian Catholicosate of the Great House of Cilicia)
 Armenian Catholic Church, founded in 1742
 Armenian Evangelical Church, founded in 1846

Armenian church buildings
Armenian Church, Brăila, Romania
Armenian Church, Bucharest, Romania
Armenian Church, Chennai, India
Armenian Church (Dhaka), Dhaka, Bangladesh
Armenian Church, Focșani, Romania
Armenian Church, Iași, Romania
Armenian Church, Pitești, Romania
Armenian Church, Singapore
Armenian Church of the Holy Nazareth, Calcutta, India